Arun Ghosh (born 7 July 1941) is a former Indian football player who represented India internationally. He also played club football for both the Kolkata giants Mohun Bagan AC and East Bengal Club.

Playing career
He was part of the team that played in the 1960 Rome Olympics under coaching of Syed Abdul Rahim. He later appeared in 1964 Merdeka Cup, where they achieved second place. In the same year, he went on to represent his nation at the 1964 AFC Asian Cup, where they also finished as runners-up as Israel clinched the title. He was also a member of the squad that won gold medal at the 1962 Asian Games Football Championship in 1962. He also played in the final, where India defeated South Korea 2–1.

Ghosh represented Bengal in Santosh Trophy, and played club football for then Calcutta Football League side East Bengal. He shifted to the "red and gold brigade" after playing for Mohun Bagan in the early 1960s.

Managerial career
In 1974, Ghosh went on to became coach of the India U-20 team along with Syed Abdus Salam, ahead of the 1974 AFC Youth Championship in Thailand. After a brief training camp in Patiala, his team participated in the tournament and reached the final. A 2–2 scoreline against Iran-20 insured that both the teams shared the trophy. Under his coaching, India U-20 team achieved their first ever continental title, in which Shabbir Ali scored five goals.

Ghosh also served as director of Tata Football Academy in Jamshedpur from 1997 to 2003.

Honours

Player
India
Asian Games Gold medal: 1962
AFC Asian Cup runners-up: 1964
Merdeka Tournament third-place: 1965, 1966

Manager
India U20
 AFC Asian U-19 Championship: 1974

East Bengal
Federation Cup: 1978–79

Mohun Bagan
Federation Cup: 1980–81

Individual
 Arjuna Award: 1965
 East Bengal "Bharat Gaurav Award": 2013

See also

 History of Indian football
 History of the India national football team
 India national football team at the Olympics
 List of India national football team captains
 List of India national football team managers

References

Bibliography

External links
 

Indian footballers
1964 AFC Asian Cup players
India international footballers
Footballers at the 1960 Summer Olympics
Olympic footballers of India
Living people
1941 births
Medalists at the 1962 Asian Games
Footballers at the 1962 Asian Games
Footballers at the 1966 Asian Games
Asian Games gold medalists for India
Asian Games medalists in football
East Bengal Club players
Mohun Bagan AC players
Footballers from Kolkata
Calcutta Football League players
Recipients of the Arjuna Award
Association football defenders
East Bengal Club managers
Mohun Bagan AC managers
Indian football managers
India national football team managers